LY-307,452 is a drug used in neuroscience research, which was among the first compounds found that acts as a selective antagonist for the group II metabotropic glutamate receptors (mGluR2/3), and was useful in early studies of this receptor family, although it has largely been replaced by newer drugs such as LY-341,495. Its molecular formula is C21H25NO4

References

Eli Lilly and Company brands
MGlu2 receptor antagonists
MGlu3 receptor antagonists